Saint Vaast or Saint-Vaast may refer to:
 Vedast, (died c. 540), Frankish bishop
 Abbey of St. Vaast, a former Benedictine monastery

Belgium
 Saint-Vaast, a commune, merged into La Louvière

France
 Airon-Saint-Vaast, in the Calvados department
 Aubin-Saint-Vaast, in the Pas-de-Calais department
 Biache-Saint-Vaast, in the Pas-de-Calais department
 Neuville-Saint-Vaast, in the Pas-de-Calais department
 Saint-Vaast-en-Auge, in the Pas-de-Calais department
 Saint-Vaast-en-Cambrésis, in the Nord department
 Saint-Vaast-en-Chaussée, in the Somme department
 Saint-Vaast-Dieppedalle, in the Seine-Maritime department
 Saint-Vaast-d'Équiqueville, in the Seine-Maritime department
 Saint-Vaast-la-Hougue, in the Manche department
 Saint-Vaast-de-Longmont, in the Oise department
 Saint-Vaast-lès-Mello, in the Oise department
 Saint-Vaast-sur-Seulles, in the Calvados department
 Saint-Vaast-du-Val, in the Seine-Maritime department

See also
 Saint-Waast (aka. Saint-Waast-la Vallée), in the Nord department
 Monceau-Saint-Waast, in the Nord department
 Arras Cathedral (Cathédrale Notre-Dame-et-Saint-Vaast d'Arras)